Andrew John Nicholls (born 14 July 1957) and Darrell Vickers (born 17 July 1957) are an English-born Canadian writing team. They were head writers of The Tonight Show Starring Johnny Carson from 1988 to 1992. Both their families moved independently from England to the same town in Canada, and they met in junior high in 1969, where they began collaborating almost immediately. The duo moved to Los Angeles in 1983 to continue their careers, and are members of WGA, WGC, SACD, SOCAN, ACCT, and ATAS.

Career
Nicholls and Vickers began writing music and comedy together while at Ridgeway Junior High School (now École élémentaire Antonine Maillet or Antonine-Maillet Elementary School) in Oshawa, Ontario, Canada. After high school they wrote for stage, radio, TV, syndicated cartoonists, and stand-up comedians.

From 1979 to 1982 they performed in Southern Ontario as Nobby Clegg and the Civilians, after having received airplay at Brampton alternative station CFNY-FM with home-recorded songs. The band found some success with the singles "Essay - Me Dad" and "I Wanna Be in Commercials", which were also included in the 1981 compilation Toronto Calling. Nicholls and Vickers later used the band's name for a character on the Showtime show Rude Awakening. In that series, the Nobby Clegg character was played by Roger Daltrey, best known as the lead singer of The Who.

From 1986 to 1992 they helped write 770 hours of produced material for The Tonight Show Starring Johnny Carson, earning four Emmy nominations, and were the show's head writers from December 1988 until Carson's retirement on 22 May 1992.

In 1997, the pair received a Genie nomination, Best Animated Series, for Ned's Newt (Nelvana). They also received a WGC nomination for the series in 1999. The title character was voiced by Harland Williams and was cited in several interviews as one of the favorite TV shows of legendary cartoonist Ed Gorey.

In 2001, the two received a Gemini nomination for "Best Comedy Series" for their work developing, writing the pilot, and serving as story editors on John Callahan's Quads!.

The duo were nominated for a Pulcinella Award, Best Animated Episode, at the 2003 Cartoons on the Bay Festival in Positano, Italy, for both The Adventures of Jimmy Neutron: Boy Genius and The World of Tosh.  They were again nominated for the Pulcinella for Best Kids Series at the 2015 festival, for Pumpkin Reports.

In 2008, Will & Dewitt was awarded a Gemini Award for Best Pre-School Series.  Nicholls & Vickers wrote the series bible and 28 episodes, and served as story editors.

Vickers co-founded a music band in 2008 called Death of the Author Brigade — which was formed through the internet (none of the band members have met in person). The band broke up in 2013. See Solo Projects (Vickers) for additional details.

In 2010, Nicholls wrote a revealingly honest exposé about the entertainment industry and the life of a Television writer and showrunner, Valuable Lessons: How I Made (And Lost) Seven Million Dollars Writing For Over A Hundred Shows You Never Heard Of. See Solo Projects (Nicholls) for additional details.

Since 2012, Nicholls has published short fiction in Black Clock, The Santa Monica Review, Cosmonauts Avenue, The Boiler Journal, New World Writing, Literature For Life, Kugelmass, The Sherman Oaks Review of Books, Shark Reef, and elsewhere.

Between 2015 and 2017, Vickers commenced on several solo television projects: executive producing the first season and writing two episodes of Hitting The Breaks (2015–16); writing the sitcom pilot for Chasing Tail (2017); creating and writing the pilot for the reality cooking show, Feast of a Lifetime, starring Lynn Crawford (2017); creating the reality show, You're the Boss (2017); and writing for the hour-long comedy drama, Marley Roberts (2017).

In 2016, MOJAVE! The Musical — featuring the tagline: "Go Ahead And Run...It Loves Fast Food," with book, music, and lyrics by Nicholls and Vickers — was directed by Mindy Cooper at its first reading on May 25, 2016, in the Della Davidson Studio, UC Davis, California.

In 2019, Nicholls' full-length stage play {LOVE/Logic}, directed by Josy Miller, had its world premiere at the Wyatt Theater Pavilion, UC Davis, California.

Nicholls published a how-to book in 2020 about the work and art of creating comedy for print, TV and stage: Comedy Writer: Craft advice from a veteran of sitcoms, sketch, animation, late night, print and stage comedy.  That same year, Nicholls began publishing poetry in the online journal Light: a journal of light verse since 1992.

In 2021, Nicholls mounted his play, A Bee in a Jar, with the UC Davis Department of Theatre and Dance and Catalyst: A Theatre Think Tank, virtually using OBS Studio and Zoom to cast in three time zones.

In 2022, Vickers wrote the pilot script for the television series, Mama Zen.

In 2022, Nicholls' play, Yes, And... won First Place in the Frostburg, Maryland 13th Annual One-Act Play Festival.

As a writing team, Vickers and Nicholls have over 1200 hours of produced television credits, including creating twenty TV series, writing and producing 38 television and radio pilots, and writing and producing over 400 episodes of children's TV (as of 2022).

Partial writing credits

Stand-up comedians
 George Carlin
 Garry Shandling
 Rodney Dangerfield
 Alan Thicke
 Joan Rivers
 The Unknown Comic
 Mickey Rooney (1984–1994)

Film

Television

Radio

Comic Strip

Band

Website

Musical

Solo Projects (Nicholls)

Solo Projects (Vickers)

References

External links
 
 
 Nicholls and Vickers' official site
 Andrew Nicholls' official site
  – video for the punk-folk college radio hit song by Nobby Clegg and the Civilians
 Nobby Clegg and the Civilians on Apple Music
 Nobby Clegg and the Civilians on Amazon Music
 Nobby Clegg and the Civilians – information on Vickers and Nicholls' defunct punk-folk college band 
 CFNY-FM Testimonial on Nobby Clegg
 Death of the Author Brigade – official page for Darrell Vickers' defunct internet music band
 Valuable Lessons: How I Made (And Lost) Seven Million Dollars Writing For Over A Hundred Shows You Never Heard Of – Andrew Nicholls' industry insider tell-all 2010 ebook (Kindle Edition)
  Comedy Writer: Craft advice from a veteran of sitcoms, sketch, animation, late night, print and stage comedy – Andrew Nicholls' 2020 guide to creating comedy for print, TV and stage

Interviews
 "And What a Reign It Was" – Time magazine interview (March 16, 1992)
 Thinking 'Toon interview with Andrew Nicholls

1957 births
Living people
Canadian male screenwriters
Canadian television writers
Canadian comedy writers
English emigrants to Canada
Writing duos
Canadian male television writers
People from Oshawa
20th-century Canadian screenwriters
20th-century Canadian male writers
21st-century Canadian screenwriters
21st-century Canadian male writers